Hellinsia aistleitneri is a moth of the family Pterophoridae first described by Ernst Arenberger in 2006. It occurs in Cape Verde.

References

aistleitneri
Plume moths of Africa
Moths of Cape Verde
Moths described in 2006